The Lure of the Bush is a 1918 Australian silent film starring renowned Australian sportsman Snowy Baker. It is considered a lost film.

Synopsis
Hugh Mostyn (Snowy Baker) is sent from his family station to England for an education and returns to Australia years later as a "gentleman", complete with a white suit and monocle. He seeks work as a jackeroo and is teased by station hands who pretend to hold him up as bushrangers, but he beats them all up. He also breaks in a wild brumby, takes part in a kangaroo hunt, defeats the station bully (Colin Bell) in a boxing match, wins the heart of the manager's daughter, and later rescues her from a rejected suitor.

Colin Bell was a real-life boxer and his on-screen fight with Baker went for five minutes.

Cast
Snowy Baker as Hugh Mostyn
John Faulkner
Rita Tress as Trixie Stanley
Claude Flemming as Harry Darvell
Colin Bell
Joan Baker as rider

Production
The script was the prize winner in a competition held by the Bulletin.

The film was shot in a property near Gunnedah. The female lead, Rita Tress, was a real life squatter's daughter.

Baker visited Hollywood in 1919 and re-shot some sequences there at Jesse Lasky's studios for its American release.

References
The film was enormously popular and earned an estimated £20,000 in profit.

References

External links

The Lure of the Bush at the National Film and Sound Archive
Complete copy of script, then titled "The Call of the Bush" at National Archives of Australia

1918 films
Australian drama films
Australian black-and-white films
Australian silent feature films
Lost Australian films
1918 drama films
1918 lost films
Lost drama films
Films directed by Claude Flemming
Silent drama films